Doilungdêqên District is a district in Lhasa, north-west of the main center of Chengguan, Tibet Autonomous Region. It is largely agricultural or pastoral, but contains the western suburbs of the city of Lhasa. The Duilong River runs southeast through the district to the Lhasa River. A prehistoric site appears to be 3600–3000 years old. The district is home to the Tsurphu Monastery (1189) and the 17th century Nechung monastery.

Topography

Doilungdêgên is said to mean "valley of bliss" in Tibetan. The district is located in south-central Tibet.
It covers an area of 2,704 square kilometers, with 94,969 acres of farmland.

The district borders on the north Tibet grasslands in the northwest. The valley of the Duilong River leads south to the Lhasa River, and is contained by two ridges of the Nianqing Tanggula Mountains.
In the south the district occupies part of the south bank of the Lhasa River. 
There are about sixty rivers and streams in total.

Environment

There are about 120 frost-free days annually.
The district is agriculturally rich and was used by the Tibetan kings as a source of food for Lhasa.
Wildlife includes roe deer, otter, brown bear, leopard, black-necked crane, Chinese caterpillar fungus, Fritillaria and snow lotus.
Military personnel have been involved in efforts to protect and improve the environment, including replanting programs.

Demographics

In 1992 there were 33,581 people in 6,500 households, with 94.28% of the people engaged in farming. 
About 90% of the people were ethnic Tibetan, with most people of other ethnicity living in Donggar.
The 2000 census gave a total population of 40,543 people: Donggar 9,359, Naiqiong 7,838, Dechen 5,731 people, Mar 4,458, Gurung 5,664, Yabda 3,664, Liuwu 3,829. 
The total population as of the end of 2007 was 45,551 people.
The first drug rehabilitation center in Tibet was being constructed in Duilongdeqing District in 2009.
It would provide physiological rehabilitation, psychological therapy and job training for up to 150 drug addicts.

Subdistricts and townships

Duilongdeqing County was founded in September 1959, and in February 1960 expanded to include the western suburbs of Lhasa.
The district has been rapidly urbanizing. In January 2015 the former county government was preparing to upgrade Doilungdêqên into Lhasa's second urban district. The county was finally upgraded into a district on 13 October 2015.
The district has jurisdiction over four subdistricts and three townships, covering thirty-five administrative villages. 
The seat of government is in the town of Donggar.
This is just  from downtown Lhasa.
Divisions are:

 Donggar Subdistrict གདོང་དཀར་ 东嘎街道
 Liuwu Subdistrict (Niu Subdistrict) སྣེའུ་ 柳梧街道
 Naiqung Subdistrict གནས་ཆུང་, 乃琼街道
 Yabda Subdistrict ཡབ་མདའ་, 羊达街道
 Dêqên Township བདེ་ཆེན་, 德庆乡
 Mar Township དམར་, 马乡
 Gurum Township རྒུ་རུམ་, 古荣乡

Economy

Until the 1980s almost all of the rural residents farmed and raised livestock. After reform and an open policy were adopted, growing numbers began to move into industry, construction, transport, commerce and more skilled occupations.
In the mid-1980s many local factories and processing plants were built at the village level, but most of them failed to survive.
The construction force grew in the 1980s to meet demand for "43 engineering projects" in Lhasa, and construction remained an important source of employment in the late 1990s. 
At the same time, inefficient traditional farming and herding practices were replaced by more modern techniques.

The economy is still dominated by agriculture. Vegetable production is an important industry in Donggar.
Other agricultural products include wheat, spring wheat, barley, peas, beans and potatoes. Livestock includes zaks, sheep, goats and poultry.
The main mineral resources are coal, iron, clay, lead and zinc.

Communications

The Qinghai–Tibet Railway runs through the district beside the Qinghai–Tibet Highway (China National Highway 318) from northeast to southwest. 
The district is crossed by China National Highway 109 in the south.
Lhasa railway station is in Liuwu township.
It includes a clinic with oxygen treatment facilities. The station uses solar energy for heating.

Landmarks

The best-known landmark is Tsurphu Monastery, built in 1189 and treated as a regional cultural relic reserve.
The monastery was founded by Düsum Khyenpa, 1st Karmapa Lama, founder of Karma Kagyu school.
It is the main Kagyu temple.
The Nechung Monastery, former home of the Nechung Oracle, is located in Naiquong township.
Nechung was built by the 5th Dalai Lama (1617–82).
Nechung was almost completely destroyed during the Cultural Revolution but has been largely restored.
There is a huge new statue of Guru Rinpoche (Padmasambhava) on the second floor.
There are also hot springs that are said to have various curative powers.

The site was protected pending formal excavation.
The site appears to be 3600–3000 years old.

See also 
 Liuwu New Area

References

Sources